Azary Abramovich Lapidus (born 23 May 1958) is chairman of SUIholding. He graduated in 1980 from Moscow State University of Civil Engineering. In 1997, he was awarded Medal "In Commemoration of the 850th Anniversary of Moscow".

Bibliography 
 A. Lapidus, "Organizational design and management of large-scale investment projects, and" - Around the World. - Moscow, LR 040 058, 1997. - 224. - (Monograph). - 500 copies.
 A. Lapidus, Telichenko VI Terent'ev M. "Technology Building" - High School. - Textbook for High School Students in the direction of training, "Construction," 2001. - 320. - 500 copies. - .
 A. Lapidus, Telichenko VI Terent'ev M. "The technology of construction processes." Part 1 - "High School". - Textbook for High School Students, 2002.
 A. Lapidus, Telichenko VI Terent'ev M. "The technology of construction processes." Part 2 - "High School". - Textbook for High School Students, 2003.
 A. Lapidus, "Design." Article - "Building Association of Universities." - System engineering construction, Collegiate Dictionary, 2nd edition, 2004.
 A. Lapidus, Telichenko VI "Information Modeling technology and business processes in construction." (Monograph) - "Association of Building schools." - 2008.
 Lapidus A. «Road Show or Love Oligarch. " - OOO "Astrel". - 2008. - S. 222. - 5000 copies. - .

References

1958 births
Living people
Russian civil engineers